Aulonothroscus validus is a species of small false click beetle in the family Throscidae. Aulonothroscus validus is found in North America specifically canada and the united states (USA). The species was discovered by Leconte in 1868. A. validus is around 2.5 to 5 mm long.

References

Further reading

 

Elateroidea
Articles created by Qbugbot
Beetles described in 1868